J. Rush Baldwin was an American politician from Maryland. He served as a member of the Maryland House of Delegates, representing Harford County, from 1947 to 1954.

Career
Baldwin was a Democrat. Baldwin was appointed to succeed John E. Clark as a member of the Maryland House of Delegates after Clark resigned in 1947. Baldwin represented Harford County in the House of Delegates from 1947 to 1954.

References

Year of birth missing
Year of death missing
Democratic Party members of the Maryland House of Delegates